Serena Rossi (born 31 August 1985) is an Italian actress, singer and television personality. She has acted in films and on stage, but is best known for her performance in the long-running Rai 3 soap opera Un Posto al Sole.

Biography 
Born in Naples, Rossi comes from an artistic family originally from Montefalcone nel Sannio (in the Province of Campobasso, Molise, Italy). She broke through with her role in Un Posto al Sole, which led to starring roles in several musicals, as well as a music album, Amore che, featuring folk songs from al Sole. After more work in television programmes and films, in 2008, Serena also appeared in the internationally popular detective series Inspector Montalbano.

In 2009, Serena appeared in Christian Duguay's Augustine: The Decline of the Roman Empire and made further appearances in Ho sposato uno sbirro, R.I.S. Roma – Delitti imperfetti and Rugantino. In 2011 she played the role of Giulia Sabatini in the TV series Che Dio ci Aiuti (2011-)

In 2013, Serena voiced Anna in the Italian version of Frozen. In 2015, Serena voiced Cinderella, played by Anna Kendrick in the Italian version of Into the Woods.

In 2014, she took part in the contest Tale e Quale Show, the Italian version of Tu cara me suena and won it, alongsidespin off Il Torneo. Among other artists, Serena imitated: Michael Jackson, Beyoncé, Pharrell Williams and Mariah Carey. In 2014, she acted in the film Al posto tuo as Anna.

In 2017, Serena starred in the film Ammore e Malavita by the Manetti Bros. playing the role of Fatima, a role which was reprised during an episode of the programme Stasera Casa Mika. Mika had seen the film and strongly wished to do a sketch with Serena.

Filmography

References

External links 

1985 births
Living people
Actresses from Naples
People of Molisan descent
Italian television actresses
Italian stage actresses
Italian film actresses
Italian voice actresses
21st-century Italian actresses